Ectopocynus ("strange dog") is an extinct genus of bone crushing canid which inhabited North America from the Oligocene to the Early Miocene.

Remains of Ectopocynus are limited to mandibles and teeth only. These reveal that the animal had simple, robust, and blunt yet massive premolars and reduced or lost cusps on the lower molars. In this respect, Ectopocynus had many of the characteristics of Enhydrocyon. This dentition suggests this animal was a hypercarnivore or mesocarnivore.

References

Wang, X. 1994. Phylogenetic systematics of the Hesperocyoninae (Carnivora, Canidae). Bulletin of the American Museum of Natural History, 221:1-207.

Hesperocyonines
Oligocene canids
Burdigalian extinctions
Miocene carnivorans
Oligocene mammals of North America
Prehistoric carnivoran genera
Rupelian genus first appearances